Zero Babu (28 December 1939 – 21 October 2020), also known as Mohammed Babu, was an Indian film singer, actor and music composer who was active in Malayalam cinema during the 1980s. He was a theater artist turned movie actor. His debut film song was for Kudumbini in 1964 at the age of 18.  In P. J. Antony’s play, K. J. Babu played the role of a man who is fed up with life owing to the cotton gambling game that prevailed in the past. Open Zero was the name of the game. Ever since he acted the role and performed a song called Open Zero, he was known as Zero Babu. He also composed few songs including Nakshathrangal Chimmum from the 1983 film Marakkilorikkalum, Manavaattippennorungi from 1982 movie Kurukkante Kalyaanam. He was a recipient of the Kerala Sangeetha Nataka Akademi Award and also sung in nearly 90 films and various plays. He has sung more than 300 movie songs.

Personal life
He was married to Athikka and has four children, Sooraj, Sulfikar, Deepa and Sabitha. He died on 21 October 2020 due to age-related illness. He was 80. His funeral held at Ernakulam North Thottathumpadi Juma Masjid on Thursday at 11 am.

Filmography

As an actor
 Maadatharuvi (1967)
 Kaboolivala (1993)

As a music composer
 Ponnonathumbikalum Ponveyilum ...	Kurukkante Kalyaanam	1982	
 Anuragame En Jeevanilunaroo ...	Kurukkante Kalyaanam	1982	
 Manavaattippennorungi ...	Kurukkante Kalyaanam	1982	
 En manassil [F] ...	Marakkilorikkalum	1983	
 En manassil [M] ...	Marakkilorikkalum	1983	
 Nakshathrangal chimmum ...	Marakkilorikkalum	1983

As a singer
 Kanninu Kanninu ...	Kudumbini	1964	
 Mundoppaadatu Koythinu ...	Bhoomiyile Maalakha	1965	
 Aakaashathambalamuttathu (duet with S. Janaki and Bangalore Latha ...	Bhoomiyile Malakha	1965	
 Kaivittupoya ...	Bhoomiyile Maalakha	1965	
 Pattiniyaal Pallaykkullil ...	Jeevithayaathra	1965	
 Vandikkaran Beeran ...	Porter Kunjaali	1965	
 Kalyaanam Kalyaanam ...	Station Master	1966	
 Kumbalam Nattu ...	Postman	1967
 Maanathekku ...	Karutha Raathrikal	1967	
 Paampine Pedichu ...	NGO	1967	
 Chakkaravaakku ...	Khadeeja	1967	
 Karakaanaakkayalile ...	Aval	1967	
 Love in Kerala ...	Love In Kerala	1968	
 Aliyaaru Kaakka ...	Ballaatha Pahayan	1969	
 Neeyoru Raajaavu ...	Saraswathi	1970	
 Vrindaavanathile Raadhe ...	Love Marriage	1975	
 Dukhithare ...	Love Letter	1975	
 Malayattoor Malayumkeri ...	Thomasleeha	1975	
 Premathinu Kannilla ...	Tourist Bungalow	1975	
 Kaanthaari ...	Criminals (Kayangal)	1975	
 Paalanchum ...	Sthreedhanam	1975	
 Uncle Santa Clause ...	Anubhavam	1976	
 Aashaane Namukku Thodangam (Maniyan Chettikku) ...	Aval Oru Devaalayam	1977	
 Kale Ninne Kandappol ...	Mohavum Mukthiyum	1977	
 Muthubeevi ...	Choondakkari	1977	
 Maasapadikkare ...	Ithikkarappakki	1980	
 Pathinaalam Beharinu (Koottiladachitta painkili) ...	Ithikkarappakki	1980	
 Maamoottil Beerante (Komban Meesakkaaran) ...	Ithikkarappakki	1980	
 Thinkalkkala Thirumudiyil Choodum ...	Ithikkarappakki	1980	
 Thaamarappoovanathile ...	Ithikkarappakki	1980
 Aayilyam ...	Naagamadathu Thampuraatti	1982	
 Dukhathin Kaippillaathe ...	Innallenkil Naale	1982	
 Swargathil N.O.C ...	Kanmanikkorumma (Ushnabhoomi)	1982	
 Sangathi kozhanjallu ...	Visa	1983

References

External links

 Malayalam Movie & Music Database (M3DB)

Malayalam playback singers
Indian male playback singers
Musicians from Kochi
Film musicians from Kerala
20th-century Indian composers
Male actors from Kochi
Male actors in Malayalam cinema
20th-century Indian male actors
Male actors in Malayalam theatre
Indian male stage actors
20th-century Indian male singers
20th-century Indian singers
1939 births
2020 deaths
Recipients of the Kerala Sangeetha Nataka Akademi Award